Craterestra is a genus of moths of the family Noctuidae.

Species
 Craterestra lucina (Druce, 1889)

References
Natural History Museum Lepidoptera genus database
Craterestra at funet

Hadeninae